Charlotte A. Adams (later Charlotte A. Cunningham) (born 1859) was an Australian mountain climber. She became the first woman of European descent to climb to the peak of Mount Kosciuszko in February 1881, aged 21.

Biography
In February 1881, Adams accompanied her father, Philip Francis Adams, on a surveying trip to the Cooma district. On the trip, she climbed to the Peak of Mount Kosciuszko, becoming the first known European woman to have made the climb.

Adams married Herbert Norfolk Cunningham on 19 April 1882.

Legacy

The village of Charlotte Pass, New South Wales is named after Adams.

References

1859 births
Year of death missing
Female climbers